Tartan Day is a North American celebration of Scottish heritage on 6 April, the date on which the Declaration of Arbroath was signed in 1320. It originated in Canada in the mid-1980s. It spread to other communities of the Scottish diaspora in the 1990s. In Australia, a similar International Tartan Day is held on 1 July, the anniversary of the repeal of the 1747 Act of Proscription that banned the wearing of tartan.

Tartan Days typically have parades of pipe bands, Highland dancing and other Scottish-themed events.

Origins
On 9 March 1986, a 'Tartan Day' to promote Scottish heritage in Canada was proposed at a meeting of the Federation of Scottish Clans in Nova Scotia (whose name means "New Scotland"). Jean Watson, President of Clan Lamont, petitioned provincial legislatures to recognize 6 April as Tartan Day. The first such proclamation was by Nova Scotia in April 1987. On 19 December 1991, in response to action initiated by the Clans & Scottish Societies of Canada, the Ontario Legislature passed a resolution proclaiming 6 April as Tartan Day, following the example of other Canadian provinces.

Meeting in 1997 in Sarasota, Florida, the Scottish Coalition USA looked to see Tartan Day recognized in the US as it was being observed in Canada. In 1998, the efforts of the Scottish Coalition with the leading help of Trent Lott saw the United States Senate Resolution adopt April 6 as National Tartan Day. This led in turn to the Congressional and then Presidential passing of the recognition of Tartan Day Observance on 6 April each year.

In Australia, wearing tartan on 1 July has been encouraged since 1989. The day has been promoted as International Tartan Day in Australia since 1996 and has been formally recognized by some states, but not at a national level.

Canada
About 15.1% or 4.7 million Canadians claim Scottish descent.
As stated above, Tartan Day in Canada originated with a proposal from the Federation of Scottish Clans in Nova Scotia and has since been proclaimed by all the provincial legislatures.  In 2007 Peter Stoffer introduced a private member's bill for 'An Act respecting a Tartan Day'. Progress of the bill was interrupted by the 2008 election; resubmitted after the election, it was unsuccessful.

An annual "Gathering of the Clans" takes place each 6 April or on the Sunday nearest to it on Parliament Hill in Ottawa at noon with pipes, drums, and dancing hosted by the Sons of Scotland Pipe Band, Canada's oldest civilian pipe band. The 2023 celebrations will be on Sunday, April 23, and will be the 15th year that the pipe band has hosted this grand event.
The 2011 celebrations marked the first time that Tartan Day has been celebrated, with Canada's official tartan having been named: the Maple Leaf.

Scotland
Angus Council, whose region includes Arbroath, established the first Tartan Day festival in Scotland on 6 April 2004 and has since joined other regional councils in attempting to develop its potential as a global celebration.

Argentina
Argentina has around 100,000 people of Scottish descent, the largest such community outside the English-speaking world. The Tartan Day parade of Scottish porteños was inaugurated in Buenos Aires on 6 April 2006 and is organized by the Scottish Argentine Society every year. A symbolic key to the gate of Arbroath's Abbey is carried to mark the date in 1320 that inspired this celebration.

Australia
Three million Australians are either Scottish or of Scottish descent. International Tartan Day in Australia is celebrated on a local basis in most states on 1 July (or by some community organizations on the nearest Sunday), the anniversary of the Repeal Proclamation of 1782 annulling the Act of Proscription of 1747, which had made wearing tartan an offense punishable with up to seven years' transportation. According to Scottish House secretary Moyna Scotland, the tendency to disguise Scottish associations was mirrored in Australia: 'Scots did what they were told to do when they came to Australia, assimilate and integrate, and they almost disappeared', and consequently one aim of Tartan Day is to help Australians reconnect with their Scottish ancestry. A tartan revival started in 1822, and now many of the Australian States, and the Commonwealth of Australia itself, have their own tartans.

In 1989, the Scottish Australian Heritage Council began to encourage Australians to wear tartan on 1 July, when more than half a million Australians gather for a celebration of Scottish heritage, combining nostalgia with Australian citizenship ceremonies, and fund-raising for charitable causes such as drought assistance. Australians without a family tartan are invited to wear the Royal Stewart tartan or the military tartan of the Black Watch. Tartan articles worn on the day include hats, ties, and socks. There are many pipe band associations in both Australia and New Zealand, some originating in disbanded Second World War army battalions, and almost 30 heritage events in Australia alone. Some clans, notably the McLeods of South Australia, come together in private events to honor their chief, recite Burns, consume haggis, and take part in Highland dancing. A butcher in Maclean, New South Wales, 'the Scottish town in Australia', reportedly celebrates the day by selling haggisburgers.

Since 2001, the Scottish Australian Heritage Council and Australian branch of the Scottish National Party have petitioned Canberra for federal recognition of International Tartan Day to celebrate the Scottish contribution to Australian history, including the influence of Scottish radicalism on the trade union movement and the Labor Party, and Australia's allegedly 'egalitarian and meritocratic' society. In 2008, Scottish culture minister Linda Fabiani floated a proposal to expand the Australian event into an official Scotland Week as part of the Scottish government's international business strategy.

United States 

There are an estimated 25 million people in the US who are of Scottish descent. Little was done to follow up the New York event in 1982. In 1998, a Coalition of Scottish Americans with the support of Senator Trent Lott successfully lobbied the Senate for the designation of 6 April as National Tartan Day "to recognize the outstanding achievements and contributions made by Scottish Americans to the United States". Senate Resolution 155, passed on March 20, 1998, referred to the predominance of Scots among the Founding Fathers and claimed that the American Declaration of Independence was "modelled on" the Declaration of Arbroath.

On 9 March 2005, the United States House of Representatives unanimously adopted House Resolution 41, which designates 6 April of each year as "National Tartan Day". H.Res.41 Chief Sponsors were Congressmen Mike McIntyre from North Carolina and John Duncan from Tennessee, who are the founding co-chairs of the Friends of Scotland Caucus in the U.S. House of Representatives.

The Tunes of Glory Parade organised by Magnus Orr and Thomas Grotrian in 2002 included 8,250 pipers and drummers marching through the streets of New York, led by Sir Sean Connery and New York City Mayor Michael Bloomberg.

References

External links
National Tartan Day USA
The Scottish Coalition USA 
New York Tartan Day Site
National Capital Tartan Day Committee, Inc.
National New York Tartan Day Committee 
American-Scottish Foundation, Inc
Minnesota Tartan Day Cooperative Committee News & Events
Official Scotland Week website

Public holidays in Canada
Public holidays in the United States
Parades in North America
Recurring events established in 1986
April observances
July observances
Scottish-American history
Scottish-American culture
Scottish-Australian culture
Scottish-Canadian culture
Scottish-New Zealand culture
Spring (season) events in Canada